Orville Martin Armbrust (March 2, 1908 – October 2, 1967) was a professional baseball pitcher. He appeared in three games in Major League Baseball, two of them starts, in 1934 for the Washington Senators.

External links

Major League Baseball pitchers
Washington Senators (1901–1960) players
Baseball players from Arkansas
Beckley Black Knights players
Memphis Chickasaws players
Chattanooga Lookouts players
Harrisburg Senators players
Elmira Pioneers players
Albany Senators players
Galveston Buccaneers players
Dallas Steers players
Jackson Senators players
Shreveport Sports players
Mobile Shippers players
Montgomery Rebels players
1908 births
1967 deaths